Pakistani football clubs have entered Asian association football competitions (AFC Champions League and AFC Cup) since the 1950s. The Asian Champion Club Tournament started in 1967, but there was no Pakistan representative during that inaugural season. Pakistani teams have participated every year in Asia, except for the early years between the 1990s and early 2000s.

Who qualifies for Asian club championships

Full Asian Record

AFC Champions League/Asian Club Championship/Asian Champion Club Tournament

Asian Cup Winners' Cup

1 Pakistan Airlines and York Sporting Club both withdrew.
2 Pakistan Airlines withdrew.

AFC President's Cup

AFC Cup

Top scorers

See also 
 AFC Champions League
 AFC Cup
 AFC President's Cup
 Asian Cup Winners' Cup
 Pakistan Premier League

References

Pakistan Premier League
Pakistan
Football clubs in the AFC Champions League
Football clubs in the AFC Cup